Cyclin-G2 is a protein that in humans is encoded by the CCNG2 gene.

Function 

The eukaryotic cell cycle is governed by cyclin-dependent protein kinases (CDKs) whose activities are regulated by cyclins and CDK inhibitors. The 8 species of cyclins reported in mammals, cyclins A through H, share a conserved amino acid sequence of about 90 residues called the cyclin box. The amino acid sequence of cyclin G is well conserved among mammals. The nucleotide sequence of cyclin G1 and cyclin G2 are 53% identical. Unlike cyclin G1, cyclin G2 contains a C-terminal PEST protein destabilization motif, suggesting that cyclin G2 expression is tightly regulated through the cell cycle.

Interactions 

CCNG2 has been shown to interact with PPP2CA.

References

External links

Further reading